Uurainen (also ) is a municipality of Finland.

It is part of the Central Finland region.

Neighbouring municipalities are Jyväskylä, Laukaa, Multia, Petäjävesi, Saarijärvi and Äänekoski.

The municipality is unilingually Finnish.

History 
The first settler of Uurainen was Paavo Minkkinen, who in 1548 established a farm named Salmela in this area. The name Uurainen is derived from the lakes Iso-Uurainen and Pieni-Uurainen.

Uurainen was originally a part of the parish of Saarijärvi. It was mentioned in 1741 under the Swedish name Uhrais. The area got its own chapel in 1801 and was variously called Uurainen, Kuukkajärvi, Kuukka and Minkkilä. The reason for the multiple names was caused by the fact that the vicarage (pappila) was located in the village of Uurainen while the church was located in the village of Kuukkajärvi on the lands of the Minkkilä farm.

Uurainen became a separate parish in 1887.

Nature
There are all together 125 lakes in Uurainen. Biggest lakes are Kyynämöinen, Sääkspää and Iso-Uurainen.

Gallery

References

External links

Municipality of Uurainen – Official website 

 
Populated places established in 1868